Bacillus sporothermodurans is a species of bacteria notable for producing highly heat-resistant endospores, hence its name. It is strictly aerobic. Its type strain is M215 (DSMZ 10599).

This species has been recently transferred into the genus Heyndrickxia. The correct nomenclature is Heyndrickxia sporothermodurans.

References

Further reading

External links

Type strain of Bacillus sporothermodurans at BacDive -  the Bacterial Diversity Metadatabase

sporothermodurans
Bacteria described in 1996